The Heist (also known as Dillinger 70, Time of the Wolves, Carbon Copy and The Last Shot) is a 1970 French-Italian crime-drama film written and directed by Sergio Gobbi. Not to be confused with the French postapocalyptic film The Time of the Wolf of 2003.

Cast 

 Robert Hossein : Robert
 Charles Aznavour : Kramer
 Virna Lisi : Stella 
 Marcel Bozzuffi :Marco
 Madeleine Sologne :  Robert's mother
 Albert Minski : Albert
 Geneviève Thénier :  Geneviève
 Monique Morisi : Janine
 Henri Crémieux : Le proviseur
 Antonio Passalia : Lucien
 Roger Coggio : L'aubergiste
 Fred Ulysse : Jean
 Félix Marten : Le patron du cabaret
 Robert Dalban : Le garagiste
 Jacques Castelot : Le juge d'instruction

References

External links

1970 films
1970 crime drama films
French crime drama films
Italian crime drama films
Films directed by Sergio Gobbi
1970s French-language films
1970s French films
1970s Italian films